The Kirkwood School, at 138 Kirkwood Rd. in the DeKalb County portion of Atlanta, Georgia, is a school complex which served as a school until 1996, and was listed on the National Register of Historic Places in 2002. It has also been known as Kirkwood Elementary School. It is included in the Kirkwood Historic District.

The original school, built in 1906, was designed by architects Bruce, Everett and Hayes. The largest building in the campus is the main school building (1922) which was expanded in 1924 and 1928. The campus also includes a cafeteria building (1950), and a library building (1964).

The main Kirkwood school building is a two-story, H-shaped building with Colonial Revival style, designed by John F. Downing and completed in 1922.

The 1928 expansion added eight classrooms to the north side of the main building, and was designed by G. Lloyd Preacher. It continued the main building's "double-loaded corridor with flanking classrooms" in compatible Colonial Revival style.

Desegregation of the school began in 1965. All eighteen teachers and nearly all of the 500 white students transferred out. In 1967 the Kirkwood neighborhood area became predominantly African American.

References

Schools in Georgia (U.S. state)
National Register of Historic Places in DeKalb County, Georgia
Historic districts on the National Register of Historic Places in Georgia (U.S. state)
Colonial Revival architecture in Georgia (U.S. state)
Buildings and structures completed in 1906
1906 establishments in Georgia (U.S. state)